Isaac Jude Price (born 26 September 2003) is a Northern Irish professional footballer who plays as a midfielder for Premier League club Everton.

Club career
Price joined the Everton academy at the age of 7. In September 2020, he signed his first professional contract with the club, signing on for three years. On 3 March 2022, Price made his professional debut as a substitute in the 2–0 FA Cup victory over Boreham Wood. In May 2022, he made his senior league debut as a substitute in a 5–1 loss to Arsenal on the final day of the Premier League season.

International career
Price has represented both England and Northern Ireland at youth international level. He is also eligible to play for Germany.

On 7 March 2023, he received his first call-up to the Northern Irish senior national team for the UEFA Euro 2024 qualifying matches against San Marino and Finland.

Personal life
Price grew up in Wakefield.

References

External links

Everton F.C. players
2003 births
Living people
Association footballers from Northern Ireland
Northern Ireland youth international footballers
Association football midfielders
English people of Northern Ireland descent
People from Northern Ireland of German descent
Northern Ireland under-21 international footballers
Premier League players